Antoine César Becquerel (7 March 178818 January 1878) was a French scientist and a pioneer in the study of electric and luminescent phenomena.

Life
He was born at Châtillon-sur-Loing (today Châtillon-Coligny). After passing through the École polytechnique he became engineer-officer in 1808, and saw active service with the imperial troops in Spain from 1810 to 1812, and again in France in 1814. He then resigned from the army and devoted the rest of his life to scientific investigation.

In 1820, following the work of René Just Haüy, he found that pressure can induce electricity in every material, attributing the effect to surface interactions (this is not piezoelectricity). In 1825 he invented a differential galvanometer for the accurate measurement of electrical resistance. In 1829 he invented a constant-current electrochemical cell, the forerunner of the Daniell cell. In 1839, working with his son A. E. Becquerel, he discovered the photovoltaic effect on an electrode immersed in a conductive liquid.

His earliest work was mineralogical in character, but he soon turned his attention to the study of electricity and especially of electrochemistry. In 1837 he became a Fellow of the Royal Society, and received its Copley Medal for his various memoirs on electricity, and particularly for those on the production of metallic sulphurets and sulphur by electrolysis. He was the first to prepare metallic elements from their ores by this method. It was hoped that this would lead to increased knowledge of the recomposition of crystallized bodies, and the processes which may have been employed by nature in the production of such bodies in the mineral kingdom.

In biochemistry he worked at the problems of animal heat and at the phenomena accompanying the growth of plants, and he also devoted much time to meteorological questions and observations. He was a prolific writer. He died in Paris, where from 1837 he had been professor of physics at the Museum d'Histoire Naturelle.

He became a correspondent of the Royal Institute in 1836, when that became the Royal Netherlands Academy of Arts and Sciences in 1851, he became a foreign member.

He was the father of the physicist A. E. Becquerel and grandfather of the physicist Henri Becquerel after whom the SI unit for radioactivity, the becquerel (Bq), is named.

His surname is one of the 72 names inscribed on the Eiffel Tower.

Works 

 Traité de l'électricité et du magnétisme, 7 volumes, 1834-1840. Vol. 2, vol. 5. 
 Éléments de physique terrestre et de météorologie, 1841.
 Traité de physique considérée dans ses rapports avec la chimie et les sciences naturelles, 2 volumes, 1842.
 Éléments d'électro-chimie appliquée aux sciences naturelles et aux arts, 1843.
 
 Traité complet du magnétisme, 1846.
 Traité de physique appliquée à la chimie et aux sciences naturelles, 2 volumes, 1847.
 
 Traité d'électricité et de magnétisme, leurs applications aux sciences physiques, aux arts et à l'industrie, 3 volumes, 1855-1856.

 
 Traité d'électrochimie, 1865.

See also
 List of works by Eugène Guillaume
 A. E. Becquerel (his son)
 Henri Becquerel, (his grandson)
 Jean Becquerel (his great-grandson)

Notes

References 
 
 Royal Society (brief biographical details)
 Catholic Encyclopedia article

External links

1788 births
1878 deaths
People from Loiret
French physicists
French Roman Catholics
Recipients of the Copley Medal
École Polytechnique alumni
Foreign Members of the Royal Society
Members of the French Academy of Sciences
Members of the Royal Netherlands Academy of Arts and Sciences